Dimitris Drikakis, PhD, FRAeS, CEng, is a Greek-British applied scientist, engineer and university professor. His research is multidisciplinary. It covers fluid dynamics, computational fluid dynamics, acoustics, heat transfer, computational science from molecular to macro scale, materials, machine learning, and emerging technologies. He has applied his research to diverse fields such as Aerospace & Defence, Biomedical, and Energy and Environment Sectors. He received The William Penney Fellowship Award by the Atomic Weapons Establishment  (AWE Plc) to recognise his contributions to compressible fluid dynamics. He was also the winner of NEF's Innovator of the Year Award by the UK's Institute of Innovation and Knowledge Exchange for a new generation carbon capture nanotechnology that uses carbon nanotubes for filtering out carbon dioxide and other gases.

Education 
He obtained his mechanical engineering degree (1982–1987) from the National Technical University of Athens in Greece. His diploma dissertation was in biofluid mechanics and concerned pulsating blood flow in an anisotropic elastic tube.

He carried out his PhD (1988–1991) at the National Technical University of Athens (NTUA) in the Laboratory of Aerodynamics, Fluids Section. His PhD concerned the development of computational fluid dynamics methods for high-speed compressible flows and co-supervised by the Flight Physics Division of Messerschmitt-Bölkow-Blohm (MBB), a German aerospace manufacturer formed later on the Airbus Group.

Career 
In 1992, he joined as research scientist and later on as a team leader at the Institute of Fluid Mechanics (Lehrstuhl für Strömungsmechanik – LSTM) of the University of Erlangen–Nuremberg (Friedrich-Alexander-Universität Erlangen-Nürnberg) under the direction of Professor Franz Durst. He researched in fluid dynamics and high-performance parallel computing at the early stages of developing parallel computers during that period.

In 1995, he joined as a lecturer the University of Manchester Institute of Science and Technology (UMIST), merged later with the University of Manchester. He worked in the Fluid Mechanics Division under Professor Brian Launder and Professor Michael Leschziner.

In 1999, he was offered a readership (associate professor position) at Queen Mary, University of London and became a full professor (professor of fluid dynamics) at the same university in 2001. He was 36 years of age.

In 2003 he joined Cranfield University  as a professor and head of the Fluid Mechanics and Computational Science Centre. He was appointed head of the Aerospace Science Departments (2005–2010). In 2012, he established the department of engineering physics in the same university, which later evolved to the Institute of Aerospace Sciences. He left Cranfield in 2015. During his tenure at Cranfield University, he held various management and leadership posts, including the director of research in the School of Aerospace, Transport & Manufacturing.

In 2011, he was the founding director of the regional high-performance scientific computing centre at The Cyprus Institute in close partnership with the University of Illinois at Urbana-Champaign, US.

In July 2015, he was appointed as the executive dean of the Faculty of Engineering and Professor of Engineering Science at the University of Strathclyde, Glasgow, one of the UK's largest engineering schools. He worked with principal and vice-chancellor, Professor Sir Jim McDonald (electrical engineer). From 2015 to 2018, he held various executive posts as associate principal and executive director of Global Partnerships.

He left the University of Strathclyde in October 2018 to join the University of Nicosia in Cyprus as the vice president of global partnerships, executive director of research and innovation, with a full professor (cross-appointment) in the medical school and the School of Sciences and Engineering. The University of Nicosia is a private, English-speaking university, the largest in Cyprus. In 2019, he founded the Defence and Security Research Institute, a multidisciplinary institute dedicated to science and technology and collaboration with governments, industry and academic worldwide.

Research 
His research covers several topics, including:

 Advanced computational fluid dynamics methods: High-resolution and high-order methods.
 Transition and turbulence: in the Large Eddy Simulation frame, mainly implicit Large Eddy Simulation, and Direct Numerical Simulation.
 High-speed flows: featuring shock waves, turbulence, and instabilities.
 Multiphase flows: He has developed and applied multiphase fluid dynamics methods to study diverse problems such as compressible fluid/solid interactions, two-phase flows, oil and gas flows, Coronavirus transmission and weather effects.
 Acoustics: acoustic fatigue and noise propagation.
 Bio-Medical: In 2020 and 2021, he published jointly with Dr Talib Dbouk a series of multiphase fluid dynamics papers investigating the contaminated saliva droplet spread, face masks, and the impact of weather on COVID-19.  
1. The article by Dbouk, D. Drikakis, On coughing and airborne droplet transmission to humans Phys. Fluids 32, 053310 (2020) received to date one of the highest Altmetric Score of all American Institute of Physics publications.  
2. The trilogy of articles received public recognition through multiple news outlets coverage worldwide.
 Heat transfer and thermal management: He has developed heat transfer models for a broad range of scales and applications, including micro and nanofluidic devices  and fundamental science to understanding solid-fluid interfaces.
 Multiscale continuum and molecular modelling: He has developed coupling methods comprising molecular and continuum mechanics. He implemented these methods in microfluidic devices, amongst other applications.
Machine learning and AI: The development of methods and models for engineering and medical applications.
 Nanotechnology and gas filtration: He developed a new generation carbon capture technology that uses carbon nanotubes for filtering out carbon dioxide and other gases at low or zero energy cost. This platform technology can be used across a wide range of applications in the power generation, automotive, aerospace, chemical, marine and built environment sectors. He has three patents in the UK Patent 2479257-A, US Patent 20130042762 and China Patent CN102892479.

Other activities 
He has been an associate editor in Computers and Fluids, Physics of Fluids (advisory board),, The Aeronautical Journal, Journal of Fluids Engineering. He is also on the editorial board of several journals in applied mathematics, engineering, biomedicine, energy, and nanotechnology.

He was on the Fluid Dynamics Technical Committee of the American Institute of Aeronautics and Astronautics (AIAA); on the board of directors of the European Aeronautics Science Network (EASN); Experts Panel and deputy chair of the European Research Council (Engineering), amongst other international committees.

External links
 https://scholar.google.com/citations?user=JAQLmxcAAAAJ&hl=en&oi=ao

References

University of Nicosia
Living people
Place of birth missing (living people)
1965 births